Oxford University Studies in the Enlightenment is a monographic series which has been published since 1955. Originally edited by Theodore Besterman, the series now comprises more than 600 books - edited volumes and monographs, in either English or French - on diverse topics related to the Enlightenment or the eighteenth century. Successors to Besterman as editor have been Haydn Mason (1976 - 1998), Antony Strugnell (1998 - 2002), Jonathan Mallinson (2002 - 2015), and the current General Editor, Gregory S. Brown, who took up the post at the start of 2016.

Name 
Previously the series was called Studies on Voltaire and the Eighteenth Century (SVEC). In 2013, the name was changed to reflect the publication's global and interdisciplinary scope, which includes the Age of Enlightenment in the long Eighteenth Century and growing scholarly move to see the Enlightenment as a movement with worldwide impact and implications. Currently it is published by the Voltaire Foundation, an academic department in the Division of Humanities of the University of Oxford. Volumes prior to 1970 were published by the Institut et Musée Voltaire in Geneva. In September 2017, the Voltaire Foundation announced a partnership with Liverpool University Press, which will take on responsibility for printing, warehousing, marketing and distribution of the series in 2018.

Topics 
The series publishes one book per month. Topics include history, literature and comparative studies, cultural studies, philosophy, the history of the book, theatre, arts and visual studies, and gender studies. Several of its books have won awards, such as the Society for the History of Natural History's Thackray Medal for Jean-Jacques Rousseau and botany: the salutary science (Alexandra Cook), and the Prix Marianne Roland Michel for The Profession of sculpture in the Paris 'Académie' (Tomas Macsotay).

Reviews

References

External links 
Index to the OUSE Series
Professor Gregory S. Brown's profile.

Monographic series
Publications associated with the University of Oxford
Age of Enlightenment